Roderick Peter Hackney (born 3 March 1942), better known as Rod Hackney, is a British architect and past president of the Royal Institute of British Architects and International Union of Architects.

Hackney is considered the pioneer of "Community Architecture" in 1974, when he fought slum clearances in Macclesfield and help local people improve their own surroundings.

Career

Hackney studied architecture at Manchester University, graduating in 1965. He then worked at Arne Jacobsen's practice in Denmark for three years before returning to Manchester to undertake a PhD.

In 1972 he formed his own practice Rod Hackney Architect in Macclesfield, and in 2008 he co-founded Kansara Hackney Ltd.

Publications

References

External links

Architects from Hampshire
Presidents of the Royal Institute of British Architects
1942 births
Living people
Alumni of the Manchester School of Architecture
British expatriates in Denmark
Presidents of the International Union of Architects